Arthur Bell (November 6, 1939 – June 2, 1984) was an American journalist, author and LGBT rights activist.

Early life

Bell was born in Brooklyn to Samuel Bell, a manufacturer of children's clothing, and, Claire Bodan Bell, a designer. When Bell was in junior high school the family moved to Montreal. Bell returned to New York City in 1960 and found a job writing jacket copy for children's books. He soon became director of publicity for children's books at Viking Press, later leaving Viking Press to work at Random House. An early member of the Gay Liberation Front and a founding member of the Gay Activists Alliance in New York City, wrote two books. Dancing the Gay Lib Blues was published in 1971 and he published Kings Don't Mean a Thing in 1978.

Journalism
Bell wrote his first piece for the Village Voice in 1969, an account of the Stonewall riots, a confrontation between police and the patrons of a gay bar called the Stonewall Inn that became a flashpoint of the Gay Liberation movement. He became a regular columnist in 1976 with his column "Bell Tells".

After Variety reporter Addison Verrill, an acquaintance of Bell's, was killed in his apartment in 1977, Bell wrote about the case in the Voice. In response he received a telephone call from someone claiming to have been the killer who, while generally appreciative of the piece, objected to being characterized as a "psychopath". The caller left some clues to his identity, and after Bell informed the police, they went to his apartment to wait in case the caller called again. A second caller identified the first to Bell as Paul Bateson, and police went to Bateson's apartment in Greenwich Village and arrested him. Bateson was later convicted of second-degree murder and served almost a quarter-century in prison.

In connection with the case, Bell wrote a series of columns about a string of unsolved murders of gay men; these columns, along with the novel Cruising by Gerald Walker, were the inspiration behind the William Friedkin film Cruising. Bell wrote additional columns condemning Friedkin and Cruising after reading a leaked early screenplay, deploring what he viewed as its negative depiction of gay people and claiming that it would inspire violence against homosexuals. At Bell's urging, gay activists disrupted the filming of Cruising and demonstrated at theatres where the film was playing.

Personal life

Bell met author Arthur Evans, at the time a film distributor, and the two entered into a relationship in 1964. They parted on bad terms in 1971, and Bell included an unflattering portrait of Evans in his book Dancing the Gay Lib Blues. The two reconstructed their friendship and Bell dedicated his second book Kings Don't Mean a Thing to Evans.

Death
Bell died June 2, 1984, at the age of 44 from complications related to diabetes.

Legacy
Playwright Doric Wilson based a character in his play The West Street Gang on Bell.

Notes

References
 Eagan, Joseph M. "Arthur Bell". Collected in Bronski, Michael (consulting editor) (1997). Outstanding Lives: Profiles of Lesbians and Gay Men. New York, Visible Ink Press. .
 Nelson, Emmanuel Sampath (2003). Contemporary Gay American Poets and Playwrights: An A-to-Z Guide. Greenwood Publishing Group. .
 Williams, Linda Ruth (2005). The Erotic Thriller in Contemporary Cinema. Indiana University Press. .

Further reading

Archival Resources
 Arthur Bell papers, 1966-1984, held by the Billy Rose Theatre Division, New York Public Library for the Performing Arts
 Arthur Bell Papers, 1970-1978, held by the Manuscripts and Archives Division, New York Public Library

1939 births
1984 deaths
American LGBT rights activists
Gay Liberation Front members
American gay writers
American activist journalists
Deaths from diabetes
20th-century American non-fiction writers
20th-century American male writers
American male non-fiction writers
20th-century American LGBT people